The following families and genera within the Dothideomycetes class of fungi have an unclear taxonomic placement (incertae sedis), according to the 2007 Outline of Ascomycota. A question mark preceding the genus name means that the placement of that genus within this order is uncertain.

Families 

 Argynnaceae
 Ascoporiaceae
 Coccoideaceae
 Cookellaceae
 Englerulaceae
 Eremomycetaceae
 Euantennariaceae
 Fenestellaceae
 Hypsostromataceae
 Leptopeltidaceae
 Meliolinaceae
 Mesnieraceae
 Micropeltidaceae
 Microtheliopsidaceae
 Moriolaceae
 Naetrocymbaceae
 Parodiellaceae
 Parodiopsidaceae
 Polystomellaceae
 Protoscyphaceae
 Pseudoperisporiaceae
 Pyrenidiaceae
 Vizellaceae

Genera

A-B

 ?Achorella
 Acrogenotheca
 Allosoma
 Amylirosa
 Anthracostroma
 Ascocoronospora
 Ascominuta
 Ascoporiaceae
 ?Ascostratum
 Belizeana
 Biatriospora
 Biciliopsis
 Bifrontia
 Botryohypoxylon
 Brefeldiella
 Brooksia
 Bryopelta
 Bryorella
 Bryosphaeria
 Bryostroma
 Bryothele
 Buelliella
 Byssogene

Top of page

C

 Calyptra
 Capillataspora
 Capnodinula
 Catinella
 Catulus
 Ceratocarpia
 Cercidospora
 Cerodothis
 Chaetoscutula
 Coccochora
 ?Coccochorina
 Colensoniella
 ?Comesella
 Crauatamyces
 ?Cyrtidium
 Cyrtidula
 Cyrtopsis

Top of page

D-F

 Dangeardiella
 Dawsomyces
 Dawsophila
 Dermatodothella
 Dermatodothis
 Dianesea
 Didymocyrtidium
 ?Didymocyrtis
 Didymopleella
 Diplochorina
 Dolabra
 Dothideopsella
 Elmerinula
 ?Endococcus
 Epiphora
 Extrusothecium
 Flavobathelium

Top of page

G-H

 Gibberidea
 Gilletiella
 Globoa
 Globulina
 ?Gloeodiscus
 Grandigallia
 ?Griggsia
 Harknesiella
 Hassea
 Heleiosa
 Helicascus
 Heptameria
 Heterosphaeriopsis
 Homostegia
 Hyalocrea
 Hyalosphaera
 Hypobryon
 Hysteropeltella
 Hysteropsis

Top of page

K-L

 Karschia
 Kirschsteiniothelia
 Koordersiella
 Kusanobotrys
 Lanatosphaera
 Lazarenkoa
 Lembosiopeltis
 Leptosphaerulina
 Leptospora
 ?Leveillina
 ?Licopolia
 Lidophia
 Limaciniopsis
 Lineolata
 ?Lophiosphaerella
 Lopholeptosphaeria

Top of page

M-O

 Macrovalsaria
 Macroventuria
 Maireella
 Massariola
 Microcyclella
 Microdothella
 Montagnella
 Moriolomyces
 Muellerites
 Mycocryptospora
 Mycodidymella
 Mycoglaena
 Mycopepon
 Mycoporopsis
 Mycothyridium
 Myriangiopsis
 Myriostigmella
 Mytilostoma
 Neopeckia
 Neoventuria
 Otthia

Top of page

P

 Paraliomyces
 Parmulariella
 Paropodia
 Passeriniella
 Passerinula
 Peroschaeta
 ?Phaeocyrtidula
 Phaeoglaena
 Phaeopeltosphaeria
 ?Phaeosperma
 Phaeotomasellia
 Philobryon
 Philonectria
 Phragmoscutella
 Phragmosperma
 Phycorella
 ?Physalosporopsis
 ?Placodothis
 Placostromella
 Plagiostromella
 Pleiostomellina
 Plejobolus
 ?Pleosphaerellula
 Pleostigma
 Pleotrichiella
 Polysporidiella
 Polystomellopsis
 ?Propolina
 Pseudodidymella
 Pseudomorfea
 Pseudonitschkia
 Pseudopleospora
 Pteridiospora
 Punctillum
 Pycnocarpon
 ?Pyrenochium
 Pyrenocyclus
 Pyrenostigme

Top of page

R-T

 Racovitziella
 Rhopographus
 ?Robillardiella
 Rosellinula
 Rosenscheldia
 Roumegueria
 Roussoellopsis
 ?Salsuginea
 Santiella
 Scolecobonaria
 Semifissispora
 Semisphaeria
 Stuartella
 ?Syrropeltis
 Teichosporella
 ?Teratoschaeta
 Thalassoascus
 ?Thelenidia
 Thryptospora
 ?Thyridaria
 Thyrospora
 Tilakiella
 Tirisporella
 Tomeoa
 Tremateia
 Trematosphaeriopsis
 Tyrannosorus

Top of page

W-Z

 Valsaria
 Vizellopsis
 Westea
 Wettsteinina
 ?Xylopezia
 Yoshinagella

Top of page

See also
List of Ascomycota genera incertae sedis

References 

 
Fungal plant pathogens and diseases
Dothideomycetes taxa incertae sedis